William G. Norton (? – February 1895) was an American college football coach. He attended Dartmouth College, where he competed in track and field, baseball, and earned varsity letters in football in 1889 and 1890. In 1890, The New York Times wrote of Norton: "it is safe to say there will not be a better second baseman in the Triangular League. He batted fairly well last year, and has improved much since the first championship game last Spring." He graduated from Dartmouth in 1890, and then attended Yale Law School.

In 1894, Norton coached the Brown University football team and amassed a record of 10–5. In November 1894, Norton left Providence, Rhode Island for Florida. His burnt body was discovered on February 3, 1895 in a cabin on the Indian River, an apparent victim of murder.

Head coaching record

References

Year of birth missing
1895 deaths
19th-century players of American football
Baseball second basemen
Brown Bears football coaches
Dartmouth Big Green baseball players
Dartmouth Big Green football players
Dartmouth Big Green men's track and field athletes
Yale Law School alumni
Sportspeople from Waukegan, Illinois
Coaches of American football from Illinois
Players of American football from Illinois
Baseball players from Illinois
track and field athletes from Illinois
Male murder victims
People murdered in Florida